Almir Turković (born 3 November 1970) is a Bosnian retired professional football forward and manager.

Turković played for hometown club Sarajevo in Bosnia and Herzegovina, and for clubs in the Croatian Prva HNL and Japanese J2 League.

Club career
Turković played for Zadar, Osijek and Hajduk Split in the Croatian Prva HNL and later played for Sarajevo in the Bosnian Premier League. He also played in Austria, Mexico for Tigres UANL during the 1995–96 season and Japan.

Turković won the Bosnian Premier League and Bosnian Cup with Sarajevo, while with Hajduk he won the Prva HNL, the Croatian Cup and the Croatian Super Cup. He made over 100 appearances for Sarajevo in all competitions.

Turković was also named the Bosnian Premier League player of the season in 2006–07. He retired at the age of 38 while playing for Sarajevo after the end of the 2007–08 season.

International career
Turković made his senior debut in Bosnia and Herzegovina's first ever official international game, a November 1995 friendly game away against Albania, and has earned a total of 11 caps, scoring no goals. His final international was a March 2003 European Championship qualification match against Luxembourg.

Career statistics

Club

International

Managerial career

Sarajevo
In January 2009, after Mehmed Janjoš was named the new manager of Sarajevo, he named Turković his assistant.

In June 2009, Turković got suspended after claiming that Sarajevo became a not serious club and that the club officials at the time didn't get the wanted players the coaching staff wanted. On 1 July 2009, the suspension was lifted and Turković came back to the coaching staff.

In April 2010, after Mirza Varešanović became the new manager, Turković wasn't anymore the caretaker manager and came back to the position of an assistant. In July 2010, after Varešanović decided that Turković will not be his assistant anymore, he decided to leave the club.

Return to Sarajevo (academy)
In January 2019, Turković was named the new head coach of the FK Sarajevo U17 team. While being the head coach of the youth team, on 13 March 2019, Turković suffered a heart attack and was needed to immediately be operated. Luckily, the operation went good and Turković has been in a stable condition ever since.

Honours

Player
Sarajevo 
Bosnian Premier League: 2006–07
Bosnian Cup: 1996–97

Hajduk Split 
1. HNL: 2003–04, 2004–05
Croatian Cup: 2002-03
Croatian Super Cup: 2005

Individual
Bosnian Premier League Player of the Season: 2006–07

References

External links

1970 births
Living people
Footballers from Sarajevo
Association football forwards
Bosnia and Herzegovina footballers
Bosnia and Herzegovina international footballers
FK Sarajevo players
SK Vorwärts Steyr players
Tigres UANL footballers
NK Zadar players
NK Osijek players
Cerezo Osaka players
HNK Hajduk Split players
Premier League of Bosnia and Herzegovina players
Austrian Football Bundesliga players
Croatian Football League players
J2 League players
Bosnia and Herzegovina expatriate footballers
Expatriate footballers in Croatia
Bosnia and Herzegovina expatriate sportspeople in Croatia
Expatriate footballers in Austria
Bosnia and Herzegovina expatriate sportspeople in Austria
Expatriate footballers in Mexico
Bosnia and Herzegovina expatriate sportspeople in Mexico
Expatriate footballers in Japan
Bosnia and Herzegovina expatriate sportspeople in Japan
Bosnia and Herzegovina football managers